Tasmanitachoides is a genus of ground beetles in the family Carabidae, endemic to Australia. The beetles are very small, typically 1.5 to 3.0 mm. in length, and live in coarse sand or fine gravel along freshwater shorelines throughout Australia.

As of 2021, there 27 described species in Tasmanitachoides, descriptions of two of them published in 2021 (T. baehri and T. erwini). Another 5 species are known but, as of 2021, have not yet been described.

The species of this group has been assigned to various genera since the description of the first was published in 1895. In 1972, T. L. Erwin proposed the genus Tasmanitachoides for the group of species. In 2019, Maddison et al. used DNA sequencing and morphological data to determine the Australian genus Tasmanitachoides should be isolated with three South American genera into a new tribe, Bembidarenini.

Species
These 27 species belong to the genus Tasmanitachoides:

 Tasmanitachoides angulicollis Baehr, 1990
 Tasmanitachoides arnhemensis Erwin, 1972
 Tasmanitachoides baehri Maddison & Porch, 2021
 Tasmanitachoides balli Baehr, 2008
 Tasmanitachoides bicolor Baehr, 1990
 Tasmanitachoides comes Baehr, 2010
 Tasmanitachoides elongatulus Baehr
 Tasmanitachoides erwini Maddison & Porch, 2021
 Tasmanitachoides fitzroyi (Darlington, 1962)
 Tasmanitachoides flindersianus Baehr
 Tasmanitachoides gerdi Baehr, 2010
 Tasmanitachoides glabellus Baehr, 2001
 Tasmanitachoides hackeri Baehr, 2008
 Tasmanitachoides hendrichi Baehr, 2008
 Tasmanitachoides hobarti (Blackburn, 1901)
 Tasmanitachoides katherinei Erwin, 1972
 Tasmanitachoides kingi (Darlington, 1962)
 Tasmanitachoides leai (Sloane, 1896)
 Tasmanitachoides lutus (Darlington, 1962)
 Tasmanitachoides maior Baehr, 1990
 Tasmanitachoides mandibularis Baehr, 2009
 Tasmanitachoides minor Baehr, 1990
 Tasmanitachoides murrumbidgensis (Sloane, 1895)
 Tasmanitachoides obliquiceps (Sloane, 1903)
 Tasmanitachoides rufescens Baehr, 1990
 Tasmanitachoides wattsensis (Blackburn, 1901)
 Tasmanitachoides wilsoni (Sloane, 1921)

References

Trechinae